1992 in Korea may refer to:
1992 in North Korea
1992 in South Korea